Vasily I Dmitriyevich (30 December 137127 February 1425) was the Grand Prince of Moscow (r. 1389–1425), heir of Dmitry Donskoy (r. 1359–1389). He ruled as a Golden Horde vassal between 1389 and 1395, and again in 1412–1425. The raid on the Volgan regions in 1395 by the Turco-Mongol Emir Timur resulted in a state of anarchy for the Golden Horde and the independence of Moscow. In 1412, Vasily reinstated himself as a vassal of the Horde. He had entered an alliance with the Grand Duchy of Lithuania in 1392 and married the only daughter of Vytautas the Great, Sophia, though the alliance turned out to be fragile, and they waged war against each other in 1406–1408.

Family and early life

Vasily was the oldest son of Dmitry Donskoy and Grand Princess Eudoxia, daughter of Grand Prince Dmitry Konstantinovich of Nizhny Novgorod.

Reign

While still a young man, Vasily, who was the eldest son of Grand Prince Dmitry Donskoy (ruled Moscow 1359–89), travelled to the Tatar khan Tokhtamysh (1383) to obtain the Khan's patent for his father to rule the Russian lands as the grand prince of Vladimir. Diplomatically overcoming the challenge of the prince of Tver, who also sought the patent, Vasily succeeded in his mission. But he was subsequently kept at Tokhtamysh's court as a hostage until 1386 when, taking advantage of Tokhtamysh's conflict with his suzerain Timur Lenk (Tamerlane), he escaped and returned to Moscow.

Vasily I continued the process of unification of the Russian lands: in 1392, he annexed the principalities of Nizhny Novgorod and Murom. Nizhny Novgorod was given to Vasily by the Khan of the Golden Horde in exchange for the help Moscow had given against one of his rivals. In 1397–1398 Kaluga, Vologda, Veliki Ustyug and the lands of the Komi peoples were annexed.

To prevent Russia from being attacked by the Golden Horde, Vasily I entered into an alliance with the Grand Duchy of Lithuania in 1392 and married Sophia of Lithuania, the only daughter of Vytautas the Great. The alliance turned out to be fragile, and they waged war against each other in 1406–1408. Vytautas had positioned himself as an "All-Russian" unifier and attacked Novgorod and Pskov, clashing with his son-on-law Vasily but later making peace. This peace allowed Vytautas to strike against the Teutonic order at the Battle of Grunwald. However, the terms of the Union of Horodlo negotiated by Polish King Jogaila, which discriminated against Orthodox Christians, caused Lithuania to lose its influence over the Russian states.

Mongol emir Timur raided the Slavic lands in 1395; he ruined the Volgan regions but did not penetrate as far as Moscow. Timur's raid was of service to the Russian prince as it damaged the Golden Horde, which for the next twelve years was in a state of anarchy. During the whole of this time no tribute was paid to the khan, Olug Moxammat, though vast sums of money were collected in the Moscow treasury for military purposes.

In 1408 Edigu burnt Nizhny Novgorod, Gorodets, Rostov, and many other towns but failed to take Moscow, though he had still burnt it. In 1412, however, Vasily found it necessary to pay the long-deferred visit of submission to the Horde.

The growing influence of Moscow abroad was underlined by the fact that Vasily married his daughter Anna to Emperor John VIII Palaeologus of Byzantium.

Domestic policy

During his reign, feudal landownership kept growing. With the growth of princely authority in Moscow, the judicial powers of landowners were partially diminished and transferred to Vasily's deputies and heads of volosts.

Russian (East Slavic) chronicles speak of a monk, Lazar the Serb, newly arrived from Serbia, inventing and building a clock on a tower in the Grand Prince's palace in Moscow behind the Cathedral of the Annunciation at the request of Vasily I, in 1404. It was the first ever mechanical clock in Russia, and also the country's first public clock. It was among the first ten such advanced clocks in Europe, and was regarded as a technical miracle at the time.

The most important ecclesiastical event of the reign was the elevation of the Bulgarian, Gregory Tsamblak, to the metropolitan see of Kiev by Vytautas, grand-duke of Lithuania; the immediate political consequence of which was the weakening of the hold of Moscow on the south-western Russian states.

Marriage and children
Vasily married Sophia of Lithuania, a daughter of Vytautas the Great and his wife, Anna. They had nine known children, five boys (of which only one survived to mature adulthood) and four girls:
Anna of Moscow (1393 – August 1417), wife of John VIII Palaiologos, died of bubonic plague
Yury Vasilievich (30 March 1395 – 30 November 1400)
Ivan Vasilievich (15 January 1397 – 20 July 1417), died on the way from Kolomna to Moscow as a result of "pestilence", just six months after marrying the daughter of Prince Ivan Vladimirovich of Pronsk and receiving the inheritance of Nizhny Novgorod
Anastasia Vasilievna (d. 1470), wife of Vladymir Alexander, Prince of Kiev. Her husband was a son of Vladymir, Prince of Kiev. His paternal grandparents were Algirdas and Maria of Vitebsk.
Daniil Vasilievich (6 December 1400 – May 1402), died of pestilence
Vasilisa Vasilievna, wife of Alexander Ivanovich "Brukhaty", Prince of Suzdal, and Alexander Daniilovich "Vzmetenj", Prince of Suzdal.
Simeon Vasilievich (13 January – 7 April 1405), died of pestilence
Maria Vasilievna, wife of Yuri Patrikievich. Her husband was a son of Patrikas, Prince of Starodub, and his wife, Helena. His paternal grandfather was Narimantas.
Vasily II of Moscow (10 March 1415 – 27 March 1462)

Sophia also suffered many miscarriages:
 A miscarriage of a daughter in the 4th month of pregnancy (19 December 1391).
 A miscarriage of a daughter in the 6th month of pregnancy (16 August 1392).
 A miscarriage in the 1st month of pregnancy (22 January 1394).
 A miscarriage of a son in the 4th and a half-month of pregnancy (17 January 1396).
 A miscarriage in the 1st month of pregnancy (4 December 1398).
 A miscarriage in the 1st month of pregnancy (30 January 1399).
 A miscarriage in the 1st month of pregnancy (30 March 1401).
 A miscarriage of a son in the 5th and a half-month of pregnancy (11 January 1403).
 A miscarriage of a son in the 4th and a half-month of pregnancy (20 March 1406).
 A miscarriage in 1410.
 A miscarriage in 1412.
 A miscarriage in 1414.
 A miscarriage in 1416.
 A miscarriage in 1418.
 A miscarriage in 1420.

See also
 Bibliography of Russian history (1223–1613)
Rulers of Russia family tree

References

External links
 Sofia's listing, along with her husband, in "Medieval lands" by Charles Cawley.

1371 births
1425 deaths
14th-century Grand Princes of Moscow
15th-century Grand Princes of Moscow
Grand Princes of Moscow
Rurik dynasty
Eastern Orthodox monarchs
14th-century Russian princes